Ranuccio I Farnese (28 March 1569 – 5 March 1622) reigned as Duke of Parma, Piacenza and Castro from 1592. A firm believer in absolute monarchy, Ranuccio, in 1594, centralised the administration of Parma and Piacenza, thus rescinding the nobles' hitherto vast prerogative. He is best remembered for the "Great Justice" of 1612, which saw the executions of a large number of Piacentine nobles suspected of plotting against him. Claudia Colla his mistress and her mother were accused of using witchcraft to stop him from having offsprings, and both were sentenced to death by burning. Because one of the conspirators, Gianfrancesco Sanvitale, falsely implicated several Italian princes, namely Vincenzo Gonzaga, Duke of Mantua and Cesare d'Este, Duke of Modena, in the plot, Vincenzo and Cesare's names appeared on the list of conspirators during formal court proceedings; as a result, Ranuccio's reputation among the rulers of Italy was irreparably damaged because it was evident that he gave credence to Gianfrancesco's obviously false confession. When, consequently, in the early 1620s, Ranuccio was looking for a bride for his younger legitimate son and heir, Odoardo, none of the Italian ruling families were forthcoming with princesses.

He married Margherita Aldobrandini, niece of Pope Clement VIII. Ranuccio, the son of a Portuguese infanta, was considered as a potential king of Portugal when his childless great-uncle King Henry died. The throne, however, passed to Philip II of Spain, whose troops had promptly occupied the country after King Henry's death.

His great-uncle King Henry's death triggered the struggle for the throne of Portugal when Ranuccio was 11 years old. As the son of the late eldest daughter of Duarte, Duke of Guimarães, the only son of King Manuel I whose legitimate descendants survived at that time, Ranuccio was according to the feudal custom, first in line to the throne of Portugal. However his father Alessandro Farnese, Duke of Parma was an ally of the Spanish king, another contender, so Ranuccio's rights were not claimed at the time. Instead, Ranuccio's maternal aunt Catarina, Duchess of Braganza, claimed the throne in an ambitious manner, but failed to become queen.

Under Ranuccio I's rule, the dukedom annexed the territories of Colorno, Sala Baganza, and Montechiarugolo.  He guided a cultural renewal in the city of Parma, supporting the arts and constructing the 4,500 seat Farnese Theater.  Numerous improvements and monuments in Parma were constructed under Ranuccio I at his behest, including a revitalization of the University of Parma and the final expansion of the city walls.  Construction of the Palazzo della Pilotta, the court palace of the Farnese family, was completed in 1620.

Ranuccio was succeeded by his son Odoardo, initially under the regency of Ranuccio's brother, Odoardo Farnese.

Issue

He married Donna Margarita Aldobrandini—the daughter of Don Giovanni Francesco Aldobrandini, Prince of Carpineto and his wife the heiress Donna Olimpia Aldobrandini, Princess Campinelli—on 7 May 1600 in Rome, St. Sixtus. The couple had nine children:

Alessandro Francesco Maria Farnese (8 August 1602), died at birth.
Maria Farnese (5 September 1603), died at birth.
Alessandro Farnese (5 September 1610 – 24 July 1630), Hereditary Prince of Parma and Piacenza, deaf and mentally disabled from birth, excluded from the succession.
Odoardo Farnese, Duke of Parma (28 April 1612 – 11 September 1646), married Margherita de' Medici and had issue.
Orazio Farnese (7 July 1613 – 28 February 1614), died in infancy.
Maria Farnese (18 February 1615 – 25 July 1646), married Francesco I d'Este, Duke of Modena and had issue.
Maria Farnese (29 April 1618), died at birth.
Vittoria Farnese (29 April 1618 – 10 Aug 1649), married Francesco I d'Este, Duke of Modena and had issue.
Francesco Maria Farnese (19 August 1620 – 13 July 1647), Cardinal.

Before his marriage Ranuccio I had a relation with Briseide Ceretoli, who was at that time unmarried; she was the daughter of Ottavio Ceretoli, a captain who had died in Flanders in the following of Alessandro Farnese, Duke of Parma. The couple had two natural children:
 (illeg.) Ottavio Farnese (1598–1643) and Isabella.

References

|-

1569 births
Regents of Parma
17th-century Italian nobility
1622 deaths
Ranuccio I
Ranuccio 1
Burials at the Sanctuary of Santa Maria della Steccata
Non-inheriting heirs presumptive